Nuvve Kavali is a 2000 Indian Telugu-language romance film directed by K. Vijaya Bhaskar and produced by Ramoji Rao under Ushakiran Movies. A remake of the 1999 Malayalam film Niram, the film stars Tarun, Richa Pallod, Sai Kiran, and Varsha (the former three make their debuts in lead roles).

Nuvve Kavali released on 13 October 2000 to widely positive reviews especially for its dialogues by Trivikram Srinivas, and the songs and background score by Koti. The film had a theatrical run of 200 days in 20 screens, grossing over 20 crore at the box office.

Produced on a shoestring budget of 1.2 crore, shot entirely in Ramoji Film City, Nuvve Kavali became a major sleeper hit at the time, and garnered the Best Telugu Feature Film award at the 48th National Film Awards. The film won four Filmfare Awards South, including Best Film – Telugu.

Plot
Tarun and Madhu are childhood best friends. They were born on the same day, in the same hospital. Even their parents are best friends from their college years and are now neighbors. Tarun and Madhu are inseparable, so much so that they study in the same college in the same class. Everyone knows them to be just friends, except Varsha, the innocent and clumsy girl who has an enormous crush on Tarun. She notices his feelings towards Madhu and asks him about that, which he firmly and laughingly denies.

Another student Prakash, a very talented singer, develops feelings towards Madhu when she spontaneously sings along with him at a college function. He, Madhu and others leave for Bangalore for a week to participate in a few inter-college competitions. As they are apart for the first time in their lives, Tarun starts missing Madhu very badly, but does not understand his feelings. His maid Rukku, who often teases him and Madhu, starts teasing him that he is missing her because he loves her. Slowly, Tarun begins to realize that indeed, he loves her. He buys a gift and greeting card to express himself when she returns. Meanwhile, he sees a girl from his college slapping her friend because he proposed to her. She, in a distressed mood, says that such guys are a shame towards friendship as they pretend to be friends, but really have other intentions. She wishes that every guy could be like Tarun so that a girl and guy could be best friends without any worries. Tarun decides not to express his feelings to Madhu, lest she too react in the same way.

Madhu returns from Bangalore and tells Tarun that Prakash proposed to her during their stay. She comes to his room to ask him what to reply and by mistake half opens the drawer in which he kept his greeting card and gift. He hurriedly closes it and asks her not to open that and tells her to agree to the proposal if she likes Prakash. She finally agrees to Prakash's proposal, but later things start to get a little rough as Prakash doesn't like the intimacy Tarun and Madhu share.

Soon Prakash's grandmother comes to Madhu's house to set the date for their marriage. Her parents agree and marriage preparations are underway. It is decided that after marriage, Madhu will leave with Prakash to USA where his whole family is settled. It is then that she realises this marriage means breaking her relationship with Tarun and leaving forever. She suddenly dislikes getting married and tries to talk to Tarun about it. He casually says that it is all part of life and inevitable. She asks how can he talk so cold-heartedly. She says she wishes she did not have to leave and wonders why she had to love Prakash. She scolds him why he did not get the idea to love her in the first place. At this point Tarun, ruled by emotions, hugs Madhu and cries and runs away from her.

Madhu grows suspicious of his actions and remembers the drawer which he did not let her open. She goes to his room and is shocked to find the card and gift. She says that she does not want to marry Prakash and will tell everyone about them. Tarun firmly refuses, saying that their parents have given them unlimited freedom and it would be very selfish and irresponsible of them to break their trust. At his insistence, she goes through the engagement ceremony. After the engagement, Tarun says that he has to go to a basketball match out of the state and will not be there for the marriage. The parents try to convince him, but he doesn't listen. Madhu gives him a ride to the station and on the way they remember their entire childhood. At the station as Tarun is boarding the train, Madhu weeps and holds him. He is unable to leave. At the house, the maid tells their parents everything and they come to the station. They find Madhu and Tarun on the platform stairs and tell them that what they feel is not wrong and it is the way of the world. They assure the love birds that Madhu's marriage to Prakash will be cancelled.

Cast

 Tarun as Tarun
 Richa Pallod as Madhu
 Sai Kiran as Prakash
 Varsha as Varsha
 Kovai Sarala as Rukku, Tarun's maid
 Giri Babu as Tarun's father
 Chalapathi Rao as Madhu's father
 Sunil as Tarun's friend
 Shankar Melkote as Tarun's north Indian neighbour
 Swapna as Journalist
 Sudha as Madhu's mother
 Delhi Rajeswari as Usha, Tarun's mother 
 Rohit as Prakash's friend (cameo appearance)
 Laila in item number
 Annapoorna as Prakash's grandmother

Soundtrack

The soundtrack was composed by Koti. Lyrics were penned by Sirivennela Seetharama Sastry and Bhuvana Chandra.

Reception 
A critic from Rediff.com opined that "What is most noticeable about the film is that Richa and Tarun, despite their debutant status, are very comfortable in front of the camera, their performances bearing comparison with the seasoned showing of Boban and Shalini in the Malayalam original". Jeevi of Idlebrain.com gave the film a rating of 4.5 out of 5 and noted that "There is never a dull moment in this film".

Box office
Nuvve Kavali had an initial budget of 0.75 crore, however, the makers spent over 1.2 crore by the completion of filming to improve the production values. The film grossed over 20 crore at the box office, making it one of the most profitable Telugu films during that time.

Awards
National Film Awards
 Best Feature Film in Telugu - Ramoji Rao: For a refreshing film about a teenage friendship that blossoms into romance. The film stands out for its youthful treatment thus bringing out the exuberance of this film.

Filmfare Awards
 Best Film – Telugu - Ramoji Rao
 Best Director – Telugu - K. Vijaya Bhaskar
 Best Actress – Telugu - Richa Pallod
 Best Playback Singer - South - Sriram Prabhu

References

External links
 

2000s Telugu-language films
Telugu remakes of Malayalam films
2000 romantic comedy films
Indian romantic comedy-drama films
Filmfare Awards South winners
2000 films
2000s buddy comedy films
2000s coming-of-age comedy-drama films
Indian buddy comedy-drama films
Indian coming-of-age comedy-drama films
Films about teacher–student relationships
Films set in universities and colleges
Best Telugu Feature Film National Film Award winners
Films scored by Koti
Films directed by K. Vijaya Bhaskar